Volleyballhalle is an indoor arena located in Munich, Germany. It hosted the volleyball competitions for the 1972 Summer Olympics in Munich.

The hall has an area of 5132 square meters and included a restaurant, restrooms, and changing area.

References
1972 Summer Olympics official report. Volume 2. Part 2. pp. 190–1.

Venues of the 1972 Summer Olympics
Olympic volleyball venues
Indoor arenas in Germany
Sports venues in Bavaria
Buildings and structures in Munich
Volleyball venues in Germany
Badminton venues